The Republican National Hispanic Assembly is an American political organization founded in 1967 which seeks to promote Hispanic-American issues and interests within the Republican Party, and the Party's interests and candidates within the Hispanic-American population. The group is partially an outgrowth of the Spanish Speaking Advisory Committee of the Republican National Committee, which itself was created as a response to successful efforts to attract Hispanic-American voters to the presidential candidacy of Richard Nixon.

History

Founding
In 1967, an informal meeting was held in Washington, DC by thirteen Hispanic-American men. As one participant, Francisco Vega, later recalled: "... the meeting came about by word of mouth... we were from Florida, California, Texas, New Jersey, Michigan, and several other states...."  The purpose of the gathering was to discuss how they could increase Hispanic political involvement. Although all of men intimated some kind of affiliation with the Democrats, none of them felt especially attached to any political party.

Having had their offers to organize some kind of Hispanic outreach rebuffed by both the Democratic and Republican Party's national offices, the dejected group returned to their hotel. Eventually, the gathering dwindled down to five: Ben Fernandez, Manuel Lujan, Fernando Oaxaca, Martin Castillo, and Vega. These last attendees continued to talk, bonded over their common World War II service and political ideologies, and, eventually, formed the Republican National Hispanic Council. Fernandez was selected as its first president.  The next year, the name of the organization was changed to the Republican National Hispanic Assembly with Fernandez taking up the title of national chairman.

Without formal acknowledgment from the Republican Party, the group immediately began to organize chapters in their home and surrounding states.  They also managed to raise more than $400,000 by the end of 1968 which they presented to astonished Party officials.  Relations between the two political entities soon warmed considerably.

RNC affiliation

As part of its 1972 re-election campaign strategy, the Nixon Administration sought to increase Hispanic electoral participation.  In addition to others, key RNHA personnel were tapped to assist in this endeavor and the Spanish Speaking Committee for the Re-Election of President Nixon was formed.  This committee has been credited an integral role in garnering more than 35% of the Hispanic vote for the President- a vast improvement over the previous three election cycles where the Republican candidate averaged only 10%.  Additionally, Fernandez and Vega occupied several important positions within Nixon's re-election campaign, in particular, the Hispanic Finance Committee.  Chaired by Fernandez, the HFC raised over $250,000 for the President in 1972.  Later that year, newly appointed RNC chairman George H. W. Bush began to lay the groundwork for a more permanent organization to woo and retain Hispanic voters.

In April 1973, Bush authorized the formation of the Spanish Speaking Advisory Committee; Castillo became its national chairman.  In meetings held with the SSAC in Crystal City, Virginia from July 11 to July 13, 1974, the RNHA was formally recognized and chartered by the RNC (it is also from this point that the RNHA dates its existence for organizational purposes).  Since that time, it has been the only Hispanic Republican group officially affiliated with the national Republican Party.

The RNHA began increasing their public profile by holding Annual Banquets starting in 1976.  President Gerald Ford delivered the keynote address at the first such event on July 29.  At that time, Oaxaca was serving as an associate director in the Office of Management and Budget.  A "Hispanic Heritage Leadership Breakfast" series was added in 1995.

Special occurrences
The RNHA ran into financial difficulties in 2007 due to declining membership concomitant with declining Hispanic numbers within the Republican Party.  However, chairman Danny Vargas reported that new fundraising efforts were underway.  Additionally, a new executive director, Bettina Inclan, was hired to revitalize the group's image.

Nevertheless, attempts at increasing Hispanic participation at the highest levels of the RNC were stymied in 2009.  The leaders of several prominent Republican and Republican-leaning Hispanic organizations- including the RNHA- complained in a March 6 letter to RNC chairman Michael Steele of the situation.  Despite assurances in a follow-up meeting, RNHA's Vargas and others would report that no movement had taken place as of a few months later.

Hispanic leaders also decried the state of Hispanics in the Party at a RNHA conference entitled "Future of Hispanics in the GOP."  Citing the debate over- and the Party's stance on- immigration as the single most important issue driving away potential voters, Vargas stated: "We know that the party will not recover its majority until we get this right."

Recent developments 
On November 20th, 2021 former National Chairwoman Betty Cardenas resigned from her national role, and the New Mexico State Chairman Ronnie Lucero was unanimously appointed as the new National Chairman. His first action as Chairman was a complete restructure of the National organization. With a career in finance and business management Chairman Lucero set an immediate goal of growing the financial network and membership reach of the organization. In just 7 months as the National Chairman, Mr. Lucero and the National team have grown the financial side of the organization in a way that will allow the RNHA National team to expand in other states not yet affiliated to RNHA. 

The National team has worked diligently and in less than one year opened 4 new state chapters bringing the organization into 27 States, and 75 counties across the country. "Not only is RNHA focused on winning the election, RNHA is focused on helping people live the American Dream" said RNHA National Chairman Lucero at a recent Press and Media event held in Albuquerque, NM. 
 
The RNHA is now setting up classes in many states to teach legal immigrants the process of citizenship, how to start business and ways that they can get involved in their communities.

Mission
The mission of the RNHA is to increase Hispanic-Americans participation in electoral politics at all levels as well as boost Hispanic-Americans membership in the Republican Party.  Furthermore, the RNHA seeks to promote the philosophy and political ideology of the Party within the Hispanic-American community.  Finally, the RNHA desires to create and sustain an association of Hispanic-Americans Republican leaders.  To that end, a series of objectives- as posted on their official web site- were formulated:

Objectives
 To promote the core principles and values of Republicanism throughout the Hispanic-American community in the United States
 To develop and maintain a strong, effective and informed Republican Hispanic-American constituency throughout the country.
 To recruit and encourage qualified, registered Republicans who support the Hispanic community to seek office at all levels of government.
 To ensure candidates who represent the true values of Republicanism are elected to office and continue to represent those values.
 To adopt resolutions and policy positions on local, state and national issues and to seek to implement these resolutions and policy positions through networks of the Republican Party and other appropriate means.
 To promote and encourage civic participation
 To insure the participation of citizens of Hispanic heritage in the American political process and in all levels of the Republican Party.

Past Chairs

 1967-1978 Benjamin Fernandez
 1978-1983 Fernando Oaxaca
 1983-1985 Dr. Tirso del Junco
 1985-1987 Fernando C. de Baca
 1987-1989 Catalina Vásquez Villalpando (resigned to assume the post of U.S. Treasurer)
 1989-1989 Al Villalobos (acting- completed Villalpando's term)
 1989-1993 Jose Manuel Casanova
 1993-1995 Alicia Casanova
 1995-1997 Antonio Monroig Malatrasi
 1997-2001 Jose "Cheo" Rivera
 2001-2005 Massey Villareal
 2005-2007 Pedro Celis, PhD
 2007-2009 Raul Danny Vargas - Businessman, Media Commentator, Political Activist
 2009-2013 Alci Maldonado
 2013-2017 Gonzalo J. Ferrer
 2017-2018 Marlynn Burns
 2018–2021 Betty Cardenas
 2021–Present Ronnie Lucero

See also

Jason Villalba
Hispanic and Latino Conservatism in the United States
Republican National Committee

Notes

External links
RNHA web site

Republican Party (United States) organizations
Hispanic and Latino American organizations
Political advocacy groups in the United States
1967 establishments in the United States